Michael Kosgei Rotich, or Mike Rotich (born October 26, 1982) is a marathon runner from Kenya.

Rotich finished second in the 2002 Milan Marathon. Winner Robert Kipkoech Cheruiyot, Rotich and third placed  Daniele Caimmi all clocked the same time, 2:08:59 hours. The same year Rotich won the Reading Half Marathon with a time of 1:03:23.

He won the Paris Marathon in 2003 setting a course record and personal best of 2:06:32 hours, both still in force as of 2008. The same year he won the Paris Half Marathon. He competed at the 2003 World Championships marathon race, also held in Paris, finishing 8th.

He finished 2nd at the 2004 Rotterdam Marathon, behind compatriot Felix Limo. In 2007 he won the Salzburg Marathon.

Rotich comes from a Kiptoit village near Eldoret. He is managed by Federico Rosa. He is an uncle to marathon world champion Abel Kirui.

He is not to be confused with Michael Rotich, a Kenyan 800 metres runner who competed at the 2004 Summer Olympics.

Achievements

References

External links 

Marathoninfo - Mike Rotich
Rosa & Associati profile

1982 births
Living people
Kenyan male long-distance runners
Paris Marathon male winners